Wiseblood was an American electronic/noise-rock band formed by Clint Ruin (a.k.a. J. G. Thirlwell) and Roli Mosimann, existing intermittently from 1985 through the early 1990s. In Ruin's words, Wiseblood was "violent macho American [music] made by non-Americans". The duo's material tended toward the realm of the darkest and most sexual Foetus songs, with Mosimann's Swans lineage showing in the slow, crushing pacing of many tracks. Thematically, Wiseblood's lyrics centered on the misanthropic exertion of power, typically via murder, sex or assault.

Discography

Studio albums
 Dirtdish (1987, K.422/Relativity Records)

Singles and EPs
 "Motorslug" (1985, K.422/Wax Trax! Records)
 "Stumbo" (1986, K.422/Relativity Records)
 PTTM (1991, Big Cat Records)

Compilation appearances
 "Cough'N'Kill" on Plow! (1985, Organik)

See also
 J. G. Thirlwell

References

External links
 Uncle Fester interview with Wiseblood (1987) archived at Foetus.org

American industrial music groups
American electronic music groups
JG Thirlwell
Wax Trax! Records artists
Thirsty Ear Recordings artists
Some Bizzare Records artists